Interstate 95 (I-95), the main Interstate Highway on the East Coast of the United States, serves the Atlantic Coast of the US state of Georgia. It crosses into the state from Florida at the St. Marys River near Kingsland and travels to the north past the cities of Brunswick and Savannah to the South Carolina state line at the Savannah River near Port Wentworth. The route also passes through the cities of Richmond Hill, Darien, and Woodbine. I-95 in Georgia has the unsigned designation of State Route 405 (SR 405).

Route description
All of I-95 in Georgia has three lanes in each direction, except in the Brunswick metropolitan area and in the area of the I-16 Intersection, where it has four lanes in each direction. From the Florida state line to west of Savannah, I-95 travels along the US Route 17 (US 17) corridor, passing near or through marshlands, and is close to the Atlantic coastline.

The highway enters Georgia via twin bridges over the St. Marys River, where it immediately enters the city of Kingsland, intersecting SR 40. The Interstate continues generally north-northeast, bypassing the smaller communities of Woodbine and Waverly en route to Brunswick, where it intersects US 17, US 25, and US 341. The freeway leaves Brunswick, bypassing the cities of Darien and Midway, before reaching the southern suburbs of Savannah. The route first encounters US 17 again, this time in Richmond Hill, before intersecting SR 204, a busy freeway and southern bypass into Savannah. The route then intersects with I-16 and US 80 in Pooler, also providing direct access to Savannah/Hilton Head International Airport via the Airways Avenue exit (exit 104). The route then reenters the city limits of Savannah and then intersects SR 17. After that, the final exit in Georgia is in Port Wentworth, where it intersects SR 21/SR 30 and SR 565 (Savannah River Parkway), the major thoroughfare between Augusta and Savannah. I-95 leaves Georgia via twin bridges over the Savannah River and heads north into South Carolina.

The state welcome centers on both ends of I-95 are integrated with other interchanges. The northbound welcome center is built into the northbound offramp with exit 1, while the onramp from here runs under a bridge beneath the same offramp before leading back onto northbound I-95. The southbound welcome center can be found just after the offramp for first southbound truck weighing center, only for both facilities to share an onramp back to southbound I-95. Other rest areas, weigh stations, and visitors centers operate independently with no access to any other facilities or destinations.

I-95 intersects I-16 near Savannah (exit 99). Ramps to and from the eastbound lanes of I-16 feature barrier gates to prevent traffic from entering I-16 in the wrong direction during contraflow lane reversal for hurricane evacuations.

The entire length of I-95 in Georgia is part of the National Highway System, a system of routes determined to be the most important for the nation's economy, mobility, and defense.

History

1960s
In 1965, I-95 was proposed from the Florida state line to SR 251 near Darien. It was under construction from there to SR 99 near Crescent. It was proposed from there to the South Carolina state line. In 1966, it was under construction from its southern interchange with SR 99 to just north of SR 131 in South Newport. In 1967, it was under construction just north of South Newport. It was under construction from Richmond Hill to I-16 near Savannah. In 1968, it was under construction from the Florida state line to SR 40 in Kingsland. It was also under construction from its southern interchange with SR 99 to SR 251 near Darien. It was open as I-95 from SR 251 to its northern interchange with SR 99 in Eulonia. It was under construction from Eulonia to US 17/SR 25 north of South Newport.

1970s
In 1970, the highway was under construction from the Florida state line to just southeast of Woodbine. It was also under construction from US 25/US 341/SR 27 near Brunswick to SR 251 near Darien. It also had an under construction from Eulonia to I-16. In 1971, it was under construction from the Florida state line to northeast of White Oak and also between the US 17/SR 25 interchanges north of South Newport and in Richmond Hill. In 1972, it was open from the Florida state line to SR 40 in Kingsland. It was under construction from Kingsland to northeast of White Oak. It was under construction from east of Waverly to US 25/US 341/SR 27 near Brunswick. It was open from there to US 17/SR 25 north of South Newport. It was open from Richmond Hill to I-16. It was under construction from just west of the South Carolina state line to the line. In 1973, it was open from the Florida state line to southeast of Woodbine. It was under construction from there to near Brunswick and from I-16 to the South Carolina state line. In 1974, the highway was open from the Brunswick to SR 38 southeast of Midway. In 1976, it was open from the Florida state line to US 17/US 84/SR 25/SR 50 southeast of Brunswick. It was open from US 25/US 341/SR 27 near Brunswick to I-16. In 1977, it was open for its entire length.

After completion
In 1998, the Georgia State Senate passed a resolution to designate the portion of I-95 between the Ogeechee River (Bryan–Chatham county line) north to the Savannah River in the Savannah metropolitan area as the Tom Coleman Highway, in honor of Tom Coleman, a Democrat who served as state senator from 1981 to 1995.

Until 2000, the state of Georgia used the sequential interchange numbering system on all of its Interstate Highways. The first exit on each highway would begin with the number 1 and increase numerically with each exit. In 2000, the Georgia Department of Transportation switched to a mileage-based exit system, in which the exit number corresponded to the nearest milepost.

Construction to widen I-95 from two to three lanes started with the Chatham County segment in 1989, with the other county segments done in phases, with the project completed throughout Georgia on December 10, 2010.

Exit list

Business loops

Darien

Interstate 95 Business (I-95 Bus.) for Darien begins at exit 42 on I-95 and travels concurrent with SR 99. I-95 Bus. and SR 99 then join US 17/SR 25 (Ocean Highway; Altamaha Historic Scenic Byway), and the four highways enter Darien. There, SR 99 splits off, while I-95 Bus. continues following US 17/SR 25 to an intersection with the southern terminus of SR 251 just north of Darien. Here, I-95 Bus. turns onto SR 251 and follows it until it reunites with I-95 at its northern terminus at exit 49. I-95 Bus. is only signed on I-95 at each exit (northbound at the southern terminus and southbound at the northern terminus) and is not signed on any of its constituent highways.

Brunswick

Former Interstate 95 Business (I-95 Bus.) for Brunswick used to serve Brunswick and the Golden Isles of Georgia between exits 29 and 38 (former exits 6 and 8). It was concurrent with US 17/SR 25 but no longer exists. The highway returned to I-95 via SR 25 Spur.

See also

References

External links

Interstate 95 Georgia (AARoads.com)
Northbound Photos
Southbound Photos

 Georgia
95
Transportation in Camden County, Georgia
Transportation in Glynn County, Georgia
Transportation in McIntosh County, Georgia
Transportation in Liberty County, Georgia
Transportation in Bryan County, Georgia
Transportation in Chatham County, Georgia
Transportation in Effingham County, Georgia
Brunswick, Georgia
Roads in Savannah, Georgia